Jasper Wolf, NSC, is a Dutch cinematographer. He is best known for his work on Monos, Instinct, Paradise Drifters, and Code Blue.

Career
Jasper was born in Amsterdam, The Netherlands. He is a member of the Netherlands Society of Cinematographers (NSC). He was invited to become a member of Academy of Motion Picture Arts and Sciences in 2020.

Selected filmography

 2022 – Bodies Bodies Bodies
 2021 – Dead & Beautiful
 2020 – Paradise Drifters
 2019 – Instinct
 2019 – Monos
 2018 – Open Seas

 2017 – Brothers
 2014 – Reckless
 2014 – Atlantic.
 2011-2013 – Van God los
 2011 – Code Blue

Awards and nominations

References

External links
 
 

Living people
Dutch cinematographers
Year of birth missing (living people)
21st-century Dutch people